Matthew Judon (born August 15, 1992) is an American football linebacker for the New England Patriots of the National Football League (NFL). He played college football at Grand Valley State, where he set the Division II record for sacks, and was selected by the Baltimore Ravens in the fifth round of the 2016 NFL Draft. During his five seasons with the Ravens, Judon received two consecutive Pro Bowl selections. He joined the Patriots in 2021 and extended his consecutive Pro Bowl selections to four.

Professional career
Judon received an invitation to the East–West Shrine Game, but was unable to play after an arthroscopy discovered what was characterized as a "tweaked meniscus". He was one of sixty-five defensive linemen to receive an invitation to the NFL combine and the first player from Grand Valley State to receive an invite in two years and opted to attend. Judon showed athleticism and strength, finishing top among defensive linemen in the 40-yard dash (fifth), bench press (fifth), and vertical jump (fourth). On March 15, 2016, he participated at Grand Valley State's pro day, along with four other teammates. Team representatives and scouts from 26 NFL teams attended his pro day as Judon ran positional drills and opted to stand on his combine numbers. He had an impressive workout and raised his draft stock, receiving much praise from scouts who attended. Throughout the pre-draft process, Judon had private workouts and meetings with the Carolina Panthers, New England Patriots, Arizona Cardinals, New Orleans Saints, Tampa Bay Buccaneers, and Philadelphia Eagles . At the conclusion of the pre-draft process, he was projected to be a fourth round pick by NFL draft experts and scouts. Although he showed a great combination of strength and athleticism, his fourth round grade was mainly due to teams being skeptical over his ability to transfer his skills to the professional game since he played Division II football in college and concerns over his history of injuries. He was ranked as the 14th best defensive end prospect by NFLDraftScout.com.

Baltimore Ravens
The Baltimore Ravens selected Judon in the fifth round (146th overall) of the 2016 NFL Draft. He was the third edge rusher the Ravens drafted in 2016, behind Boise State's Kamalei Correa (second round, 42nd overall) and BYU's Bronson Kaufusi (third round, 70th overall).

2016
On May 5, 2016, the Baltimore Ravens signed Judon to a four-year, $2.59 million contract with a signing bonus of $255,736.

The Baltimore Ravens opted to make Judon an outside linebacker since their 3-4 scheme would better suit him at that position over defensive end. He competed with Terrell Suggs, Elvis Dumervil, Albert McClellan,
Za'Darius Smith, Kamalei Correa, Chris Carter, and Victor Ochi throughout training camp for a job as a starting outside linebacker. Head coach John Harbaugh named him the backup weakside linebacker behind veterans Terrell Suggs and Za'Darius Smith to begin the regular season.

He made his professional regular season debut in the Baltimore Ravens' season-opener against the Buffalo Bills and assisted on one tackle in their 13–7 victory. Judon was inactive for Weeks 4-5 despite playing well in the first three games as the Ravens decided to play Elvis Dumervil who had recovered from his foot injury. On October 23, 2016, Judon recorded three combined tackles and made two sacks on New York Jets' quarterbacks Ryan Fitzpatrick and Geno Smith in their 24–16 loss. His first career sack on Geno Smith in the second quarter caused Smith to tear his ACL and miss the remainder of the season. During a Week 14 matchup at the New England Patriots, Judon recorded a season-high five combined tackles  in their 30–23 loss. He finished the  season with 27 combined tackles (12 solo), four sacks, and two pass deflections in 14 games and zero starts. Judon played minimally due to a lot of depth at the position and the Ravens staff wanting to develop.

2017
He competed with Albert McClellan, Terrell Suggs, Za'Darius Smith, Tyus Bowser, Boseko Lokombo, and Tim Williams throughout training camp for the vacant starting outside linebacker job left by the departure of Elvis Dumervil in free agency. On August 26, 2017, he recorded four solo tackles and sacked Buffalo Bills' quarterback Tyrod Taylor in their 13–9 victory. Judon was named the Baltimore Ravens' starting strongside linebacker, beating out rookie Tyus Bowser, to begin the  season.

Judon made his first career start in the Baltimore Ravens' season-opener at the Cincinnati Bengals and made one solo tackle and defended a pass in the Ravens' 20–0 victory. During a Week 2 against the Cleveland Browns, Judon recovered a fumble by quarterback DeShone Kizer, that help set up the Ravens' offense on an eventual touchdown scoring drive in the 24–10 victory. On October 15, 2017, Judon recorded a career-high 14 combined tackles (12 solo) and sacked Chicago Bears' quarterback Mitchell Trubisky twice in their 27–24 loss. On November 19, 2017, he collected seven combined tackles, two sacks, and forced a fumble during the Ravens' 23–0 win against the Green Bay Packers, earning him AFC Defensive Player of the Week. He finished the season playing in all 16 games with 12 starts, recording 60 combined tackles (50 solo), eight sacks, three passes defensed and two forced fumbles. His eight sacks finished second on the team behind Terrell Suggs' 11 sacks.

2018
In 2018, Judon played in 16 games with eight starts, finishing tied for second on the team with seven sacks, along with 44 combined tackles, three passes defensed, and a forced fumble.

2019
In week 11 against the Houston Texans, Judon recorded a team high 7 tackles and 2 sacks on Deshaun Watson, one of which was a strip sack on that was recovered by teammate Jaylon Ferguson, in the 41–7 win.
In week 14 against the Buffalo Bills, Judon sacked Josh Allen 1.5 times, including a strip sack which was recovered by Jihad Ward during the 24–17 win which clinched a playoff berth.
In week 17 against the Pittsburgh Steelers, Judon recorded a strip sack on Devlin Hodges which was recovered by teammate Michael Pierce during the 28–10 win.

2020
The Ravens placed the franchise tag on Judon on March 13, 2020. On May 28, 2020, Judon signed the one-year, $16.808 million franchise tender. In Week 4 against the Washington Football Team, Judon recorded his first two sacks of the season on Dwayne Haskins during the 31–17 win.
In Week 8 against the Pittsburgh Steelers, Judon was ejected from the game after making contact with an official. He was placed on the reserve/COVID-19 list by the team on November 3, 2020, and activated two days later. He was placed back on the COVID-19 list on November 30, and activated again on December 9. In Week 15 against the Jacksonville Jaguars, Judon recorded a sack on Gardner Minshew in the endzone for a safety during the 40–14 win.

New England Patriots

2021
On March 19, 2021, Judon signed a four-year, $56 million contract with the New England Patriots. Judon surpassed his career high in sacks by Week 11, earning him Pro Bowl honors for a third consecutive season.

2022
In Week 5, Judon had two sacks in a 29-0 win over the Detroit Lions, earning AFC Defensive Player of the Week. Judon surpassed his career high in sacks by Week 11 against the New York Jets, recording 1.5 sacks and reaching 13 on the year. He finished the season with 15.5 sacks, which was fourth in the NFL, along with 60 tackles, two forced fumbles, and three passes defensed.

NFL career statistics

Personal life 
Judon is one of ten children. At Grand Valley State, he wore the number 9 to honor his nine siblings. When the NFL changed uniform rules to allow defensive linemen to wear single-digit numbers in 2021, he chose it for his uniform number with the Patriots.

References

External links
Grand Valley State Lakers bio
Baltimore Ravens bio

1992 births
Living people
American football defensive ends
American football linebackers
Baltimore Ravens players
Grand Valley State Lakers football players
New England Patriots players
People from West Bloomfield, Michigan
Players of American football from Michigan
Sportspeople from Oakland County, Michigan
American Conference Pro Bowl players